Arturo Frondizi Ércoli (October 28, 1908 – April 18, 1995) was an Argentine lawyer, journalist, teacher and politician, who was elected President of Argentina and ruled between May 1, 1958 and March 29, 1962, when he was overthrown by a military coup.

His government was characterized by an ideological shift, inspired by Rogelio Frigerio, towards a type of developmentalism less promoted by the State and more oriented to the development of heavy industry as a consequence of the installation of multinational companies. Its socio-labor, oil and educational policy had peaks of high conflict, with large demonstrations and strikes by the labor movement and the student movement, as well as numerous attacks against the government for political purposes in which 17 civilians and soldiers were murdered.

The Frondizi government suffered great pressure from the armed forces, which was imposed on it by the liberal Economy Ministers Álvaro Alsogaray and Roberto Alemann, and the retirement of Frigerio as a government advisor. Despite this, Frondizi was able to continue with its development line. He was unable to finish his presidential term, as he was overthrown by a coup on March 29, 1962. That day he was detained by the coup military and a decree of the Executive Power of José María Guido validated his detention without trial for eighteen months, preventing him from participating in the 1963 elections. Frondizi criticized the inauguration and the government of Arturo Illia, who in fact accepted the overthrow of Frondizi as legal and annulled some of his oil contracts. In 1966 he supported the military coup that overthrew Illia, thinking that the "Argentine Revolution" was an opportunity to make an economic revolution. However, he would abandon that idea when Adalbert Krieger Vasena assumed the Ministry of Economy.

On April 18, 1995, Arturo Frondizi died at the age of 86 at the Hospital Italiano in the city of Buenos Aires of natural causes.

Biography 

Arturo Frondizi was born on October 28, 1908 in Paso de los Libres, province of Corrientes, Argentina. Son of Isabella Ércoli de Frondizi and Giulio Frondizi.

The couple, shortly after getting married, had arrived in the country in the early 1890s from the Italian town of Gubbio. Giulio achieved a comfortable position for his home as a building contractor.

Arturo was one of 14 sons; his brothers included Silvio, who became a professor of law at the University of Buenos Aires (UBA) and was assassinated in 1974 by the Triple A, and Risieri, who became a philosopher and rector of the University of Buenos Aires. The family relocated to Concepción del Uruguay in 1912, and in 1923 to Buenos Aires.

In the mid-1920s, Frondizi played soccer as a defender in the lower ranks of Club Almagro. On some occasion he claimed to be a fan of said club. In 1926, he suffered a serious injury to his arm as a result of a bad fall.

Arturo and Silvio traveled in 1923 to the province of Buenos Aires accompanied by their father. They attended the Mariano Moreno National School, where later Risieri would also study. In 1925, before completing the last year of high school, Arturo tried to enter the Colegio Militar de la Nación, but was postponed.

During those last years of high school, he turned his life upside down, beginning to worry more about studies, he put aside games and sports. In this way, during the fifth year, his grades began to improve. Already as a distinguished student, he began to contribute to the student newspaper Estimulen.

Beginnings in politics 
Frondizi identified with Yrigoyenismo when he was a teenager and studying in high school. Hipólito Yrigoyen had been elected president when he was 8 years old and served his term when he was 14. For the first time in Argentine history, a president had been elected by secret and compulsory vote, in massively attended elections. Despite this, and throughout his university career, Frondizi had a negative view of political activity and vowed never to set foot in a local party.

In 1927, he entered the Law School of the University of Buenos Aires, where he graduated in July 1930. He refused to withdraw his diploma of honor the year after it was issued, due to his refusal to receive it from the hands. of the then de facto president José Félix Uriburu, who had overthrown Yrigoyen on September 6 of the previous year.

His opposition to the dictatorship that overthrew Yrigoyen led him to participate in a demonstration on May 8, 1931, during which he was arrested and placed at the disposal of the provisional government.

Frondizi himself has said that this arrest decided him to put aside the career of teacher that he had planned to pursue, to start a career as a politician. At the end of 1932 he was arrested for the second time and after being released he joined the Unión Cívica Radical.

On October 28, 1932, Frondizi got engaged to Elena Luisa María Faggionato, to marry on January 5, 1933. From this union his only daughter, Elena, would be born in 1937. They built a summer cottage in 1935 at the then-secluded seaside resort town of Pinamar. After the birth in 1937 of their daughter, Elena (their only child), the Frondizis named the cottage Elenita.

In December 1933 he would be arrested for the third time, suspected of being involved in an uprising against the national government.

He led the Argentine League for the Rights of Man, the nation's first recorded human rights organization, upon its founding in 1936. In December of that year, he narrowly escaped an assassination attempt while addressing a crowd.

Deputy and Radical Civic Union (1946-1958) 

Frondizi drafted a progressive platform alternative (the 1945 Declaration of Avellaneda) for the UCR before the February 1946 elections. He was elected to the Argentine Chamber of Deputies in 1946. The intransigent current then assumed the leadership of the party, with two of its members being elected, Ricardo Balbín and Arturo Frondizi, respectively, president and vice president of the radical bloc of national deputies, in the so-called Block of 44.

At the beginning of 1948, Frondizi was reelected deputy, imposing the MIR in the internal elections of the Federal Capital. In December Frondizi undertook a tour of Latin America, the United States, Europe and Africa.

1951 presidential election 

In the 1951 presidential elections he was nominated by the Radical Civic Union to join the presidential formula as a candidate for vice president of the Nation, accompanying Ricardo Balbín as a candidate for president. The radical formula obtained 31.81% of the votes, being defeated by the Peronist formula, made up of Juan Perón and Hortensio Quijano, who obtained 62.49%.

In 1954, Frondizi was elected president of the National Committee of the UCR.

His multiple political commitments did not prevent him from dedicating himself to intellectual activity, which is how at the end of 1954 he published Petroleum and Politics, a book-complaint on the activity of oil companies in Argentina, and spoke of YPF's monopoly on the oil sector. The book would become a best-seller the following year, during heated debates over the oil contracts signed by Perón and Standard Oil of California; Thanks to this, Frondizi would position himself in the foreground of the national political scene, reinforcing his fame as an intellectual and his leftist profile.

The division of the UCR 
Parting ways with Balbin, Frondizi formed an "intransigent" wing of the UCR. The UCRI separated from the more conservative and anti-Perónist Ricardo Balbín at the UCR's 1956 convention.

On November 9, 1956, the National Convention of the UCR met in Tucumán. The position of the party led by Frondizi, the Intransigence and Renewal Movement, was one of repudiation of the military government; He proposed taking the initiative and putting pressure on him by appointing a presidential formula. The Balbinistas (now separated from the MIR), unionists and sabattinistas, closer to the Liberating Revolution, rejected the proposal, since they were in favor of the military government. The National Convention voted in favor of the intransigent proposal and elected Arturo Frondizi as the candidate for President of the Nation. The unionists, balbinistas and sabattinistas, then left the Convention and on February 10, 1957 they formed a new party, a separate party, the Unión Cívica Radical del Pueblo, known as the conservative wing of the UCR.

The intransigents also split into a party and took the title of Unión Cívica Radical Intransigente. The party quickly defined a position inspired by the Declaration of Avellaneda, but adapted to the postwar situation, attracting a large number of youth and progressive sectors outside the party, such as the socialists Dardo Cúneo and Guillermo Estévez Boero or the forger Raúl Scalabrini Ortiz. These were characterized by a non-anti-Peronist national center-left position, as well as by the developmental thinking supported by Rogelio Frigerio from the magazine Qué !. Furthermore, Frondizi and Frigerio established a close relationship with the newspaper Clarín, to the point that until 1982 the newspaper identified itself with developmentalism and the future MID.

1958 elections 
The campaign for the 1958 presidential elections had a high level of activism from the militants, who, in addition to doing their usual task of stickers, began to massively paint the walls of buildings with the names of the presidential formula. Such acts did not take long to arouse criticism from the press. It was the most expensive campaign that was made up to that moment in Argentine history. The party ordered the recording of a tango entitled "Frondizi, ¡Primero vos!", With lyrics and music by Daniel Quiroga.

The military dictatorship decided to ban the Peronist Party in the 1958 elections. It also established that only those provinces that had a constitution in force as of December 1, 1957 could participate in it (the provincial constitutions had been abolished by the dictatorship through the military proclamation of 1956); Due to this, citizens of the provinces of La Pampa and Misiones were not allowed to participate in the election.

Most historians accept that there was some kind of secret understanding between Perón and Frondizi for the proscribed Peronist vote to turn in favor of the UCRI candidate. It is presumed that the pact was made due to a reserved personal management of Rogelio Frigerio, who made contact with John William Cooke or with Perón himself during his exile in Venezuela, agreeing on the conditions in various meetings held, first in Caracas in January 1958 and then in Ciudad Trujillo (Dominican Republic) in March 1958.

The pact would have consisted of Perón ordering his followers to vote for Frondizi, and if he won the elections, he would have to comply with fourteen points that made up the agreement, including normalizing the unions and the CGT, repealing the decrees prohibiting Peronism and order the return to Perón of the personal property that he had left in the country and the dictatorship had confiscated.

The UCRI managed to win in all the provinces where the Frondizi-Gómez formula was presented, with which it was obtained all the governorships, the senate and two thirds of the chamber of deputies, in elections classified as unusual until today. On May 1, General Pedro Eugenio Aramburu handed over command to the president elected by suffrage on February 23, 1958 to Arturo Frondizi.

Presidency

His period of government was characterized by adopting developmentalism as a basic government policy, based on the recommendations of ECLAC and the definitions of the so-called dependency theory, developed from the 1950s by intellectuals from all over Latin America. However, frondizista developmentalism differed from Cepalian by resorting mainly to the establishment of multinational companies, rather than to the State, as a driving force behind industrial development. By 1956, Frondizi began to abandon the position of his book Petroleum and Politics, and thought that oil contracts with foreign industries could constitute a solution to the energy deficit.

The opening to the world also took place in the cultural field, when certain cultural manifestations that had been buried under Peronism flourished during the Frondizist period. Universities adopted new disciplines such as sociology and psychology.

As president, Frondizi struggled with conservative and military interference over much domestic and international policy. Because of economic problems in the country and a steep rise in consumer prices, the military forced him to impose harsh austerity measures in 1959, which resulted in civil unrest.

Better able to maneuver after the 1959 recession, Frondizi began to see results from his economic policies (known as desarrollismo — "developmentalism"); by 1961, he earned the support of much of the country's large middle class. He tried to lift the electoral ban on Peronism. In addition, he met with Che Guevara and Fidel Castro to aid in mediating their dispute with the United States. This led the military to withdraw their support from his administration, as it opposed leftist populist movements and Communism.

In this period, most Perónists feared being associated with left-wing figures, and sided with the military in their opposition to the left. Military pressure on Frondizi did not relent. He signed the Conintes Plan in 1960, which banned Communism and suspended civil liberties, but he eschewed doing any implementation. Frondizi tried to negotiate an entente between the U.S. and Cuba with a secret meeting in August 1961 at the Quinta de Olivos residence with the Cuban envoy (and fellow Argentine) Che Guevara. The military scuttled any future talks, and Frondizi adopted a neutral stance afterwards.

Economic policy 

Frondizi sought to strengthen the economy by solving the main economic problems that had haunted Argentina over the last twenty years. These included insufficiency in oil production (60% of the oil had to be imported and 80% of all the oil was used to generate electricity), inadequate steel production, the lack of electricity, and the insufficiency and obsolescence of transport (especially railways). He had inherited economic problems from Perón's 1946-55 administration, characterized by budget deficits because of huge railroad subsidies during this period. These subsidies cost the treasury a million dollars a day. In addition, Perón had used much of the US$1.7 billion in budget reserves at the time of his election to nationalize the various private railway companies by buying them from French and British interests. The nationalized companies were modernized and expanded. Critics say they resulted in too many employees and bloated payrolls that have since strained national budgets.

Frondizi assigned economist Rogelio Julio Frigerio to develop a bold plan to make Argentina self-sufficient in motor vehicles and petroleum, as well as to quickly extend the country's semi-developed road and electric networks. (In the 1950s, these served less than half the population, and fewer than 20% in the poorer north). Frondizi's economic vision was a radical departure from the nationalist one of Perón. To achieve greater investment in industrial development, Frigerio supported passage of the Law of Foreign Investment. This provided foreign corporations with incentives similar to those offered to local ones. It created the Department and Commission of Foreign Investments, which was also designed to give foreign investors more legal recourse when operating in the country.

In 1962, Argentina was richer in terms of GDP per capita than Austria, Italy, Japan, and its former colonial master Spain. Inflation would rise as a result of the investments made in 1958 and 1959 (some of them emerging as regards the energy problem), to such an extent that at the beginning of 1959 it reached 113% per year.

Industrial policy 

Between 1958 and 1963, the historical maximum of foreign investments in Argentina was reached: around 23% of the total for the period between 1912 and 1975. The industrial branches favored in this second stage of the import substitution process were the automotive, the oil and petrochemical, chemical, metallurgical and electrical and non-electrical machinery. Investments were oriented towards taking advantage of the possibilities offered by a protected domestic market.

In 1958, contracts were signed with US oil companies so that they would operate on behalf of YPF. The purpose was to achieve self-sufficiency in hydrocarbons and not have to buy them abroad. In three years of management, an increase of 150% was achieved in the production of oil and natural gas in Argentina. For the first time in history, the country achieved oil self-sufficiency, and Argentina went from being an importer to being an oil exporter.

Petroleum
Frondizi's development of Argentina's sizable petroleum reserves was used to foster nationalism among voters as well as strengthen the economy. When Frondizi came into office in 1958, oil production had not grown significantly since the sometimes abusive Standard Oil was forced out in the 1930s. As Argentina relied more on motor vehicles, oil imports drained the country in foreign exchange. How to achieve increased oil production was a contentious issue by the 1940s. The UCR (Radical Civic Union) favoured a state monopoly, believing it necessary to control the oil reserves. In the Declaration of Avellaneda (a common platform supported by Balbin's UCRP—his wing of the UCR—and Frondizi's UCRI), the state's need to invest in oil exploration and to make Argentina self-sufficient in the short term was expressed as policy.

Frondizi encouraged foreign investment in the sectors that had created chronic trade deficits between 1949 and 1962. 90% of all foreign investment during his term went into oil exploration, oil refineries, the auto industry, steel, and household durables. Ten of the 25 largest projects were for exploration of new oil fields. The record public investment in the petrochemical sector led to a fivefold increase in synthetic rubber production; by 1962, the production of crude oil tripled to 16 million cubic meters. Achieving self-sufficiency in oil freed hundreds of millions of dollars in annual import costs for Argentina. It helped create 13 years of nearly uninterrupted economic growth, particularly in industry.
Thirty-six oil drilling rigs had been purchased for the extraction of oil, the largest purchase made in the history of Argentina. In 1960, more than one hundred of these teams were working for the Administration, twice as many as YPF normally had, thus solving the energy crisis that existed around 1958, and ending the "electric diet" and the blackouts that occurred. the country suffered constantly.

Labor policy 
From 1957 elections were held in the unions, most of them winning Peronism. The unions had been grouped into three groups: the 62 Organizations (Peronists), the 32 Democratic Guilds (socialists and radicals) and the MUCS (communists).

In 1958, through law 14 499, it was established that each retiree would automatically receive an equivalent of 82% of what they received when they worked.

In October 1960, independent Peronist unions formed the Commission of 20 to demand the return of the General Labor Confederation (CGT), which had been intervened by the government since the military coup in 1955. To pressure the government, the Commission of the 20 declared a general strike on November 7, which forced President Frondizi to receive them and finally agree on March 3, 1961 to return the CGT to the Commission of the 20.

Educational policy 

Following the university reform of 1918, Argentine education, especially at university level, became more independent of the government, as well as the influential Catholic Church. The church began to re-emerge in country's secular educational system during Perón's rule, when catechism was reintroduced in public schools, and parochial institutions began receiving subsidies. A sudden reversal in the policy in 1954 helped lead to Perón's violent overthrow, however, after which his earlier, pro-clerical policies were reinstated by Aramburu.

Frondizi initially opposed Aramburu's Law 6403 of 1955, which advanced private education generally, and parochial, or more often, Catholic-run schools (those staffed with lay teachers), in particular. Confident the new policy would be upheld, church supporters founded the Argentine Catholic University.  The UCRI campaigned against the policy, though when Frondizi took office, he shifted in favor of further, pro-clerical reforms, which he then referred to as "free education." Opposed by many in his own party, and especially by the President of the University of Buenos Aires (his brother, Risieri), Frondizi was open about his motivation for the policy change, declaring that "I need the support of the church."

The Educational Freedom Law, signed in early 1959, also freed private universities from limits imposed by the 1885 Avellaneda Law, under which they could not issue official degrees directly, only through a public university. The law led to controversy because most of the new universities and private schools, which would become eligible for state subsidies, were religious. Supporters applauded Frondizi's vision of private universities that could co-exist with public ones, and it was seen as a progressive measure. Those in favour of a strictly secular educational system believed the law to be a concession given to the Church in exchange for support, however, and became disillusioned with the pragmatic Frondizi.

Frondizi, however, advanced other educational reforms to dovetail with his economic policy. His administration incorporated the National Workers' University network of campuses (technical schools inaugurated by Perón in 1948) into the national university aegis, by which he established the UTN system in 1959, and opened numerous new campuses. The UTN became the leading alma mater for Argentine engineers in subsequent decades.

International policy 

Arturo Frondizi maintained a policy of good relations with foreign countries.

The Frondizi presidency began in times of the Cold War and politics exterior embodied by the president sought to be at the service of a national strategy of economic development and integration. They were the beginnings of decolonization, sought to avoid conflicts even though they existed at a lower rank, within the blocks.

The Frondizi government imagined the postwar world in competition economic and peaceful coexistence, factors that replaced the bloc strategy and containment. Against a majority political opinion, he dismissed a new world conflagration. Argentina's foreign policy should then serve a national development and integration strategy. The perimidated economic link with the United Kingdom and the need to finance development led to the foreign policy will veer towards relocation within the continent.

Frondizi becomes in more than one country the first Argentine president to set foot on these lands. He maintained strong relations with his Latin American peers, with the United States, European countries and also Asian countries.

Latin America 
While Arturo Frondizi formed his cabinet, he planned a tour of countries in Latin America, with the purpose of promoting bilateral relations. Between April 7–17, 1958, frondizi toured the cities of Montevideo, Rio de Janeiro, São Paulo, Santiago and Lima.

Beagle conflict 
After the Snipe islet incident in the Beagle Channel, the governments of Argentina and Chile tried to make approaches to solve their border problems. On February 2, 1959, President Arturo Frondizi landed at Los Cerrillos Airport and signed, together with his Chilean counterpart Jorge Alessandri, the Joint Declaration on Arbitration in which both leaders agreed to "immediately enter into negotiations aimed at finding the right formulas appropriate arbitrations, which allow the resolution of existing disputes ". The two presidents had agreed to submit to arbitration by the British government (or in its absence the president of the Swiss Confederation), the border dispute in the area of the Encuentro river and the valleys of Palena and California, while the Beagle dispute would be submitted to the International Court of Justice in The Hague.

A series of diplomatic protocols were signed with Chile in 1960, one of the protocols submitted the Paleina issue to arbitration, another was the Beagle Protocol, in addition to two Agreements: one for navigation through the southern channels and another for permanent arbitration. 

Presidents Frondizi and Alessandri met in Santiago de Chile, where they made a Declaration on the "agreement that contains all the bases for the peaceful solution of pending boundary issues within the two countries" except Antarctica. It was in this agreement that the dispute in the Beagle Channel was intended to be submitted to the decision of the Inter-American Court of Justice in The Hague. On June 12, 1960 they met in Buenos Aires the ambassadors of both countries to sign what became known as the Beagle Protocol and the Navigation Protocol, which allowed, among other things, the passage of Argentine warships through the channel and the Strait of Magellan, in addition, the treaty established limits precise, as for example, a border line that would run along the middle line of the canal leaving the canal divided for both countries. But the treaty like the Navigation Agreement were rejected by the congresses of both nations.

Throughout his entire government, Frondizi had meetings with Latin American figures such as Juscelino Kubitschek, Janio Quadros, Jorge Alessandri, Manuel Prado Ugarteche, Adolfo Lopez Mateos, Víctor Paz Estenssoro, among others.

Europe 

Throughout the year 1960, President Frondizi carried out a European tour in which he visited Italy, The Vatican, Switzerland, France, Belgium, Germany, Holland, Great Britain and Spain.

Frondizi arrived in Rome where he was received by the President of the Italian Republic Giovanni Gronchi. The Argentine president included a short stay in the city of his ancestors: Gubbio. Frondizi visited the pontiff John XXIII in a private audience that, later, was shared by other members of the Argentine delegation. The Pope stated that the Argentina, born Catholic, sought to bring to the world a message of peace in which the values of the spirit will illuminate understanding among men.

Frondizi visited Bern. Although the Swiss country did not maintain an intense movement trade with Argentina, however it was an opportunity to do business with Swiss industrialists. The Argentine president was received by Max Petitpierre, president of the Confederación, who hailed him as "the rebuilder of the economic stability of Argentina, the new liberal line that you adopted for the new Argentine economy has won the sympathy and trust of our authorities and those who support commercial relations with your country ".

Frondizi arrived in France with knowledge of the discrepancy between the two countries in the United Nations Assembly, on Algeria. In the first interview between Frondizi and de Gaulle, he received him with his hand raised and a question: "How has your country voted in the United Nations against France?" Frondizi will responded: "my country cannot stop showing solidarity with the peoples who fight for theirself-determination ", and added" we learned it from the influence of the French Revolution ".

The Argentine president arrived in Brussels, where he received a "warm reception"; in the speeches the reference to José de San Martín was present, for his residence during some of his years of exile. It was the first time that a president Argentinean visited this country which ranked third in European exports to the Argentina. The Argentine president visited the port of Antwerp and took the opportunity to make contact with businessmen and authorities of the Chamber of Commerce of that city. Jacques van Offelen, Minister of Foreign Trade, was present at the press meeting given by the Argentine president.

Frondizi in Bonn and Bad Godesberg, Bethovenian cities, exalted the German contributions to universal culture. He also visited Cologne, where he met with businessmen, and Essen, a city in North Rhine-Westphalia located in the heart of the industrial region of the Rhur basin, center of the German steel industry. The Argentine president was received by Adenauer, who was accompanied by his finance minister Ludwig Erhard. At the meal offered by Chancellor Adenauer to Frondizi, he called him "a friend of our country "and praised the skill with which he kept the helm:" we continue with interest in the development of Latin America ".

The Argentine president arrived in Amsterdam, where he was received by members of the royal family: Queen Juliana and Prince Bernhard. The Dutch press had greeted to the president who came with favorable headlines. Queen Juliana entertained Frondizi with a meal in which she recalled the cordiality with which Prince Berhnard had been received, on the occasion of attending the commemoration of the 150th anniversary of the declaration of Argentine independence. He stressed: "isolation is no longer of our era."

Frondizi arrived in the United Kingdom, in a trip that aroused great expectations, Upon his arrival he was received by the Prime Minister English Harold Mac Millan; complied with the protocol for visiting Queen Elizabeth II, the imposition of the decorations and, immediately afterwards, a meeting awaited him press at the Argentine embassy. In the two interviews with Mac Millan, the Argentine president expressed his hope that Britain would use its influence to channel investment into Argentina. The Argentine president raised the possibility that Argentina could be part of 

the OECE or, at least, have an observer, since in it Latin America it must have his voice.

Spain could not be absent from the European tour of the Argentine president, who was hailed as "professor of humanism." He was received by General Francisco Franco, remembering the community of language, religion and culture that united both peoples. In the official interview, Frondizi was awarded the Order of Isabel la Catholica and, in turn, imposed on the head of the Spanish government that of the Liberator General San Martin. The two leaders held an interview behind closed doors.

United States and Cuba 

Arturo Frondizi was the first Argentine president to make an official visit to the United States. He was there from January 19 to February 1, 1959. Frondizi met with Eisenhower on January 22 at the White House. The Argentine President would once again highlight the achievements of having been in office for a year, and reiterated that Argentina would need credits for hydroelectric power and producing steel. Then he mentioned the Peruvian-Ecuadorian border conflict, everyone present agreed that the solution to the conflict would be of great importance for the entire continent. Eisenhower then told Frondizi that members of his administration were watching the progress made in Argentina, and they admired the president's courage and leadership. During a speech before the OAS Frondizi denounced the deterioration of the terms of trade in the region and supported the Pan-American Operation of President Juscelino Kubitschek, whose goal was the development and formation of capital in Latin America.

The president Eisenhower visited Argentina in February 1960. Both leaders issued the "Declaration of Bariloche" (a treaty on the protection of national parks), with the intention of promoting a better standard of living for the American countries.

Presidents Arturo Frondizi and John F. Kennedy came to have a good personal relationship and even mutual consultation on international issues. Although both had similar positions politically and economically, they defined certain aspects of security in the hemisphere. On the one hand, Kennedy encouraged the Alliance for Progress to counter Cuban influence in order to help underdeveloped countries and favored democratic change in Latin America. However, his administration endorsed a security policy with characteristics opposed to the foreign policy of the Frondizi government, and precisely in February 1962 he delivered a message to the country in which he defended the principle of non-intervention and the right of self-determination of the peoples. 

Kennedy wanted Argentina to be the mediator between the United States and Cuba in the conflict of the "missile crisis", since these two countries were experiencing a very serious confrontation motivated by the fear of the United States that Cuba could have weapons at its disposal nuclear weapons coming from the Soviet Union pointing towards its territory. Hence, at the request of the US president, a meeting between Frondizi and Ernesto Guevara was encouraged to discuss the thorny issue in addition to trying to direct relations between the two countries after the Americans failed to invade the island. from Cuba.

Thus Frondizi tried to approach as a mediator between both sides in a neutral way, but, due to military pressure, on February 8, 1962, he would be forced to break relations with La Havana.

Four months after the revolution in 1959, Cuba was still part of the Organization of American States (OAS), the island had not yet declared itself a socialist, and the figure of Fidel Castro was even sympathetic to some sectors that would later revile him. On May 1, he arrived at the Ezeiza Airport, and Hermes Quijada was the first to welcome him on behalf of President Arturo Frondizi. He immediately arrived in Buenos Aires, and the following day he gave a famous ninety-minute speech before the Commission of the 21 of the OAS in the building of the Secretariat of Industry, in his speech praised the American democracy, which had welcomed Latin American immigrants with decorum. A group of protesters received the leader of the Cuban revolution. The visit was not welcomed by the Argentine military. During the OAS Conference, meeting in Punta del Este in January 1961, Argentine Foreign Minister Miguel Ángel Cárcano opposed the exclusion of Cuba from the inter-American system. After the conference, Frondizi received Ernesto Guevara, Argentine representative from Cuba, at the Olivos residence.

Of the four possible mediators, Arturo Frondizi argued in favor of Argentina, due to its balance in foreign policy (Brazil and Mexico were closer to third-partyism) and due to the lack of a deep internal contradiction (Chile had a conservative government with opposition communist). In the first polls, both John Kennedy and the Cubans were willing to accept that basis for the talks: Frondizi came very close to achieving a great diplomatic solution, but did not take into account the inconveniences he would encounter on his home front. Preliminary talks were held at the Cuban Embassy in Buenos Aires. Someone who did not belong to the diplomatic service, but who was linked to the Frondizi team, contacted Ernesto Guevara at that time (1961) and let the Argentine president know that the Cuban minister accepted his mediation to try to find a negotiated solution. At the same time, some Argentines such as Horacio Rodriguez Larreta (father) met with Guevara in Punta del Este and participated in the famous meeting he held with Richard Goodwin, an advisor to President Kennedy. After that conference, Guevara let Frondizi know that he was interested in talking with him. 

At that time, Guevara agreed to reach an understanding with the United States to coexist peacefully. When Guevara told Frondizi that he wanted to speak with him and that he was willing to travel to Argentina, he also added that if the news of his visit to Argentina was publicly known, his life was at great risk, and that it would most likely be murdered. Frondizi replied schematically: first, that he was preparing to receive him and considered the interview convenient; second, that if he was determined to travel, he should go to Montevideo Airport (Guevara was in Punta del Este): from that moment on, he would be under the responsibility of the Argentine government. Guevara accepted and Frondizi sent a civilian plane from Buenos Aires to the Uruguayan capital.

The meeting between President Arturo Frondizi and Ernesto Guevara caused Adolfo Mugica to resign twenty days later from his position as Minister of Foreign Affairs and Worship on August 29, 1961. Frondizi's attitude towards the Cuban Revolution of 1959, along with the visit of Fidel Castro and Ernesto Guevara ended up weakening the government's relationship with the military power, even more than it already was. The army formally protested these meetings with Cuban leaders, and pressured the president to change his policy with respect to Cuba. Cuban exiles in Buenos Aires tried to forge documents with the intention of implicating members of the Government in an alleged Castro plot. Frondizi ordered an investigation, and even the army's own report, the famous case of the "Cuban letters," was nothing more than a lie. Frondizi gave a speech on the national network to try to provide explanations.

Asia 

During a tour of India, Thailand, and Japan, President Frondizi met Rajendra Prasad, King Rama IX and Emperor Hirohito. The objective was to seek new markets, in response to Argentina's imperative need to trade and obtain investments, a key to the program development and trade cooperation.

One of the objectives sought with these meetings was to reinforce Argentina's non-aligned international position in the face of the Cold War.

Israel: kidnapping of Adolf Eichmann 
At the end of 1952, the fugitive Nazi criminal Adolf Eichmann had been located in Argentina thanks to information provided by a friend of the Austrian Nazi hunter of Jewish origin Simon Wiesenthal. Given the difficulty that Israel could obtain the extradition of Eichmann by Argentina (with the consequent danger that the criminal would flee), the Israeli secret services of Mosad designed the kidnapping of the wanted Nazi criminal with the firm support of Israeli Prime Minister David Ben Gurion, thus violating consular assistance treaties and Argentine national sovereignty.

Finally, on May 11, 1960, Eichmann was kidnapped in the middle of the street, getting him into a private car when he was getting off the bus to return home from work. Later, the four men of the Israeli Secret Service transferred him on May 20 from Ezeiza International Airport in Buenos Aires to Israel in a private plane, with another identity and pretending that he was drunk.

Faced with this kidnapping, the Foreign Ministry, through Ambassador Mario Amadeo, complained to the United Nations Security Council for the serious violation of sovereignty. It received support from the international body, but Israel never intended to return the Nazi criminal to Argentina. Diplomats from the United States, Great Britain and France tried to formalize a meeting between President Arturo Frondizi and David Ben Gurion so that both would seek a solution to the Eichmann case, and that diplomatic relations between Argentina and Israel would not be broken as a result. After several contacts, it was agreed that the meeting between the two leaders would be held in Brussels in June 1960, finally frustrating such meeting due to misgivings between the diplomacy of both countries.

Ultimately, Frondizi severed diplomatic relations with Israel, relations that had recently been established by President Juan Perón. A short time later, Frondizi re-established ties with Israel.

On December 11, 1961, Adolf Eichmann was found guilty of crimes against humanity and sentenced to death on December 15, carried out on May 31, 1962. His last words were: "Long live Germany. Long live Austria. Long live Argentina. These are the countries that I identify with the most and I will never forget them. I had to obey the rules of war and those of my flag. I'm ready ".

Antarctic Treaty 

The Antarctic Conference was inaugurated in Washington DC, United States on October 15, 1959, in an atmosphere of uncertainty, attended by representatives of twelve states, of which seven claimed their sovereignty over some fraction of the Antarctic continent, among which were : Argentina, Australia, Chile, France, Norway, New Zealand, and the United Kingdom.  The territorial rights claimed by Argentina, Chile, and the United Kingdom overlapped considerably. Meanwhile, five other countries (Belgium, the United States, Japan, South Africa and the Soviet Union) had carried out explorations in the region without having presented territorial claims. There were aspects of the future regulation for Antarctica that had the general consensus of the nations, such as the pacification of the continent and excluding all activities of a warlike nature, as well as guaranteed access for scientific research for any country that desired to do so. The most complex problem was the consideration of sovereignty claims.

Argentina's position was to establish the peaceful use of Antarctica and scientific cooperation within agreed limits, and that the Conference not modify the rights of the parties in the least. Regarding the use of the territory, the Argentine Government maintained the need to put limits on absolute freedom, in order to preserve ecological interests, and to prohibit nuclear tests and the deposit of radioactive waste. The last proposal took the US delegation as well as the Soviet one by surprise, and the Argentine insistence on it came close to causing a crisis in the meeting, not only internationally, but also within the government of Arturo Frondizi.

The treaty was finally signed on December 1, 1959, and was maintained in accordance with the demands of Argentina that activities of a military nature had to be outlawed. The Antarctic Treaty entered into force on June 23, 1961. The pact had some success since the area remained free of conflict. The council also succeeded in internationalizing and demilitarizing the Antarctic continent, where nuclear testing and storing radioactive waste were banned. During the Cold War these activities were carried out with great intensity by the belligerent powers. It was ensured that the region is used for peaceful purposes, including mainly joint exploration and scientific research. The signatory countries obtained free access to the entire region with reciprocal rights to inspect their facilities.

In his speech on May 1, 1960, Frondizi dedicated a paragraph to the Conference on Antarctica, stating that Argentina had been able to include in the treaty its opposition to the internationalization of the area. The principles of freedom and scientific cooperation had also been included in the treaty.

After signing the treaty, Frondizi visited Antarctica. On March 6, 1961 he embarked, along with his entourage, in the Aguirre Bay to go to the Decepción base (Decepción Island). The outward journey was somewhat uncomfortable, as they had to endure severe storms at the crossing of Drake Pass. On March 8 in the afternoon, they anchored in Bahía 1º de Mayo, and then with the icebreaker General San Martín the first tributes were paid to the authorities who disembarked, being transferred by helicopters and boats to the detachment where the honors were repeated. The military vicar Donamin held a mass, and from there Frondizi gave a speech to the country and greeted the members of the National Navy, researchers, scientists and technicians.

Overthrow

Around 4:00 in the morning, the Commander-in-Chief of the Army Poggi sent a radiogram to all the military units communicating: The President of the Republic has been deposed by the Armed Forces. This decision is immovable.

At 7:45 a.m. on March 29, 1962 Frondizi left the Olivos residence by car accompanied by his usual personal custody and by Captain Eduardo Lockhart, Head of the Military House, heading to the distant Metropolitan Airport a few minutes from trip, where he boarded a Navy plane that took him to Martín García Island where he was detained. Lockhart had personally drawn up the instructions to be delivered to the head of the base - who had already been notified by telegraph of the trip - so that he would receive treatment according to his status as former president.

After ordering the overthrow of Frondizi at 4:30 in the morning, the coup plotters remained without defining who would take over the government. Just at 11:00 am, "with the presidential office vacant for almost eight hours," the three commanders held the first of many other meetings to evaluate the alternatives.

But Frondizi, aware that he did not have much time left in government, idealized a plan.

Frondizi's plan 
Since the previous day, a group of civilians and soldiers had been moving against the clock and in the midst of great difficulties, to carry out Frondizi's latest plan, destined to save what could be legally, making Guido swear before the Supreme Court, under of the law of acephalia.

The difficulties to carry out Frondizi's plan were many. Guido had no direct contact with Frondizi and his loyalty to the President prevented him from making any decision that Frondizi had not ordered. Martínez, for his part, did not belong to the UCRI, he had assumed as Minister two days ago on the recommendation of Aramburu and did not even know Guido personally.

For that, Guido himself, the members of the Supreme Court, the coup commanders and the leaders of the UCRI had to be convinced. Potash says that four men played the most important roles in this operation: Defense Minister Rodolfo Martínez, Supreme Court President Julio Oyhanarte, Air Force Commander-in-Chief and one of the coup leaders Brigadier Cayo Alsina, and himself Arturo Frondizi.

Guido's oath before the Supreme Court 
At 3:55 p.m., when the formalities for Guido's oath before the Supreme Court were still being completed, the three coup leaders settled in the Casa Rosada. Aware of the fact and with Guido on his way to court, Martínez went to the Casa Rosada to buy time and prevent the military from formally taking over the government, especially Poggi, who showed a clear intention to assume as president. Shortly after five o'clock in the afternoon, Guido appeared at the Supreme Court to take the oath, visibly shaken. The oath was carried out in the utmost reserve, with the sole presence of the judges of the Court, Guido, and his private secretary. Minister Martínez had asked General Aramburu to join the small group, but Aramburu did not accept.

Tradition indicated that the oath was taken on the Bible, but due to the urgency and the lack of a Bible in the offices of the Court, the decision was made to take the oath on the text of the Constitution. Immediately afterwards Guido burst into tears and embraced Oyhanarte, asking that he not be considered a "traitor to his party or the people." Villegas Basavilbaso for his part said - expressing his objections -: "We can say, like Cicero, that we have saved the Republic by violating the law." It was Colombres who replied: "Cicero is wrong, because whoever saves the Republic can never be breaking a law."

Later life

Frondizi was held in detention until July 1963. After his release and the return of Frigerio from exile, they founded the Integration and Development Movement (MID) on a developmentalist platform. Unable to field candidates in the 1963 elections due to military and conservative opposition, the MID and Perón agreed on a "National Popular Front." The alliance was scuttled by military pressure, and the MID endorsed a "blank vote" option.  Those among Frondizi's former allies who objected to this move backed the progressive former Buenos Aires Province Governor, Oscar Alende, an erstwhile Frondizi ally who ran on the UCRI ticket (its last) and finished second.

Following the pragmatic Arturo Illia's election, the MID was allowed to participate in the 1965 legislative elections, sending 16 members to the Argentine Chamber of Deputies. Policy differences over Frondizi-era oil contracts, which Illia rescinded, led the MID to oppose him actively. Frondizi initially welcomed the 1966 coup against Illia. Frigerio became a significant shareholder in Argentina's largest news daily, Clarín, following a 1971 deal made with the news daily's owner, Ernestina Herrera de Noble. Her late husband and Clarín founder Roberto Noble had supported Frondizi.

With Perón's return from exile imminent, Frondizi chose to endorse the aging leader's ticket for the 1973 elections. Following seven years of military rule, the reopened Argentine Congress included 12 MID Deputies. Frondizi was given little say in the new Perónist government, and its policy shifted from populism to erratic crisis management measures. The return of peronism exacerbated political tensions in Argentina, and there was an outbreak of violence between factions. In 1973 members of Perón's government organized the Triple A, a right-wing death squad. Among its estimated 600 murder victims was Frondizi's brother, Law Professor Silvio Frondizi, who had served as chief counsel to the Trotskyite ERP. He was killed in 1974.

Frondizi initially supported the 1976 coup against Perón's successor (his inexperienced widow Isabel Perón). He dropped his early support for the regime because it appointed an ultra-conservative Economy Minister, José Alfredo Martínez de Hoz. Numerous MID figures received death threats.

The dictatorship conducted the Dirty War against the political opposition, killing and injuring tens of thousands of political opponents and distantly related suspects in terrorist disappearances, kidnappings and tortures. In 1982 it was defeated in the Falklands War, which further damaged its popular support. Finally the junta allowed return to democracy with elections in 1983. The dictatorship left an insolvent Argentina; business, political and consumer confidence almost shattered; and international prestige damaged because of its years of state terrorism against its population.

Suffering from the early stages of Parkinson's disease, Frondizi named his friend, Frigerio, the MID nominee for president. Refusing to condemn the regime's human rights atrocities, the MID fared poorly on election night. It garnered 4th place (1.5%) and elected no congressmen.

Elected by an ample margin, UCR leader Raúl Alfonsín excluded Frondizi from the economic policy discussions he held before taking office. In 1986 Frigerio succeeded the ailing Frondizi as President of the MID, though the former president remained influential in the party. The MID maintained a considerable following in a number of the less developed Argentine provinces, where voters had fond memories of the Frondizi administration's development projects. It helped elect allies within the Justicialist Party (Perónists), in Formosa and Misiones Provinces, as well as Mayoral candidate Néstor Kirchner in Río Gallegos, Santa Cruz Province; Kirchner was elected as governor and, in 2003, President of Argentina.

Frondizi supported Perónist candidate Carlos Menem in the May 1989 elections. His support soured when Menem turned to neo-liberal and free trade policies.

Personal life and death 
Frondizi lost his daughter in 1976, and his wife in 1991. Living in seclusion in his Beruti Street apartment (in Buenos Aires' northside), Frondizi occasionally received political figures seeking advice.

On April 18, 1995, Arturo Frondizi died at the age of 86 at the Italian Hospital in the city of Buenos Aires for unknown causes. His death went so unnoticed that to this day it is very difficult to find out the exact cause of it. In 2019 his remains, which rested in the Recoleta Cemetery, were transferred to the Concepción del Uruguay.

Three years after his death, in 1998, the Konex Foundation awarded the memory of the former president with the decoration of honor.

Theft of the presidential sash and stick 
On April 3, 2008, almost one hundred years after his birth, and the Casa Rosada museum was being remodeled since January of that year, an employee noticed that the cane and the presidential sash that Frondizi had donated seventeen years earlier to the museum were missing. . No explanations were found for this fact, since there were four security cameras around the museum sector, and to enter it you had to leave a fingerprint, but, apparently, no progress was made in the investigation of this case.

Tribute and legacy 

Arturo Frondizi is recognized not only as a lucid and effective politician, but as a statesman, that is, a politician capable of looking beyond the routines of the situation, a consideration that surely includes more or less critical nuances, but with its lights and shadows even his most bitter opponents ponder him. In 1958 Frondizi set out to think the nation in tune with the theoretical and political categories that he considered more modern. Sixty years later Frondizi won its place in history and developmentalism continues to be one of the most interesting and suggestive proposals when it comes to thinking about the national destiny.

Dr. Arturo Frondizi was the democratic president of the Argentines between 1958 and 1962. His prestige, based on personal and political values, has grown over time. He was an intellectual "borrowed" from politics and a builder of examples, prosperity and wealth for his country and his people. He lived with austerity and died surrounded by the affection and recognition of a grateful society. Increasingly, Argentine democracy and Argentines exalt his figure and serve as a role model of the politician with ethical, civic conduct and as a public servant.

On Friday, October 28, 1999, a plaque with the name of the former Argentine president was discovered in a square in the city of Gubbio, in the Italian region of Umbria where Frondizi's parents were born, on the occasion of the anniversary of his birth. The mayor of the city, Ubaldo Corazzi and the president of the local Rotary Club, Gaetano Nardelli, represented the Italian officials. On behalf of Argentina, the ambassador to Italy, Félix Borgonovo; the Minister of Education, Manuel García Solá; the head of the Arturo Frondizi Foundation, Dr. Cañete and the former minister and official of the Frondizi government, Antonio Salonia. This is how this square in Gubbio was named «Piazza Arturo Frondizi».

Argentine politicians such as Cristina and Néstor Kirchner, Roberto Lavagna, Ricardo López Murphy and Eduardo Duhalde (among others), claimed to be admirers of Arturo Frondizi's management, regardless of their ideology or political party. Many of them considered him one of the best leaders, and also, as the last president with a country project.

Ten years after his death, a tribute was paid at the central headquarters of Banco Nación, on Rivadavia Avenue, in front of the Casa Rosada, where more than one hundred and fifty friends and great followers of him gathered. Frondizi was a great defender of democracy. Through his permanent developmentist affirmation, he opened a path that Argentines must necessarily travel, said Raúl Alfonsín, who praised Frondizi in this way despite the fact that they had both belonged to different lines of radicalism, which were very much at odds at that time. The tribute lasted all that day.

On March 6, 2008, the Legislature of the City of Buenos Aires renamed the 9 de Julio Sur Highway with the new name of Autopista Presidente Arturo Frondizi in homage to the former Argentine president.

By municipal ordinance 5465 of October 7, 2008 the name of "President Arturo Frondizi" was imposed on the Junín Industrial Park in homage to the contribution that the ex-president made to the national industry. The corresponding act was carried out on November 7, 2009.

On June 22, 2008, the official courier presented a stamp with the slogan "Arturo Frondizi - 100 years after his birth - 50 years since he became president of the Nation" in the Blue Room of the Palace of the National Congress. On the stamp you can see the face of the former president, and next to it, some oil extraction pumps, all with a light sky blue background.

On October 28, 2008, a statue in homage to the former president was erected in a square that bears his name in Paso de los Libres.

On April 3, 2009, the Argentine Government ordered the issuance of a coin with the image of Arturo Frondizi, in commemoration of the hundredth anniversary of his birth and the fiftieth anniversary of his assumption as president of the Argentine Nation. The measure was made official on March 4, 2009 in Law 26,479, published in the Official Gazette. The regulation bears the signature of Vice President Julio Cobos, that of the President of the Chamber of Deputies, Eduardo Fellner and that of Parliamentary Secretary Enrique Hidalgo.

On September 29, 2010, the councilors unanimously approved the draft ordinance to name "President Arturo Frondizi" to the La Carlota industrial park. The councilors participated in the Honorable Deliberative Council on September 29. The Justicialista Party supported the project, as did the UCEDE. Radicalism was not present, although Vice President Roberto Gadea stated that: «the important thing is the Industrial Park, therefore, the name is fine; so we also support this agreement.

Frondizi also received an extensive list of decorations and recognitions both nationally and internationally.

Honours

Decorations

Honorary doctorates 

 : University of Ottawa, 1961
 : University of San Marcos, 1958
  Hawaii: University of Hawái, 1961
 : University of Perugia, 1960
 : Waseda University, 1961
 : University of Madrid, 1960
 : Thammasat University, 1961
 : Fordham University, 1959

Awards and distinction 

 : Konex of honour, 1998
 : Key to the city of tokyo, 1960
 : Key to the city of madrid, 1960
 : Uruguayan Parliamentary Distinction, 1958

Notes 

  The economic plan was known as Developmentalism. Basically, it consisted in achieving industrialization through foreign investment. This idea came originally from Raul Prebisch from the CEPAL (Economic Commission for Latin America) and was modified by Rogelio Frigerio, the right hand of Frondizi.
 The government created both departments under the orbit of the "Secretary of socio-economic relations" (controlled by Frigerio) on the 21 of July 1958
320 million of a total of 1310 million of the imports went into oil: Celia Szusterman, Frondizi: La política del desconcierto, emecé, Buenos Aires, 1998

Bibliography

 Potash, Robert A. The Army & Politics in Argentina: 1945-1962; Peron to Frondizi (Stanford University Press, 1969).
 Szusterman, Celia.  Frondizi and the Politics of Developmentalism in Argentina, 1999—62 (Basingstoke: Macmillan, 1993),

 Belenky, Silvia. Frondizi y su tiempo. Buenos Aires: Centro Editor de Latinoamerica, 1984.
 Díaz, Fanor. Conversaciones con Rogelio Frigerio. Buenos Aires: Editorial Hachette, 1977.
 Frigerio, Rogelio. Los cuatro años (1958–1962). Buenos Aires: Editorial Concordia, 1962.
 Frigerio, Rogelio. Diez años de la crisis argentina. Buenos Aires: Editorial Planeta, 1983.
 Frondizi, Arturo. Qué es el Movimiento de Integración y Desarollo. Buenos Aires: Editorial Sudamericana, 1983.

References

1908 births
1995 deaths
People from Paso de los Libres
Argentine people of Umbrian descent
Radical Civic Union politicians
Intransigent Radical Civic Union politicians
Integration and Development Movement politicians
Presidents of Argentina
Members of the Argentine Chamber of Deputies elected in Buenos Aires
20th-century Argentine lawyers
University of Buenos Aires alumni
Argentine prisoners and detainees
Honorary Knights Grand Cross of the Order of St Michael and St George
Grand Crosses Special Class of the Order of Merit of the Federal Republic of Germany